Verse is a 2009 Bolivian film, starring Mirtha Elena Pardo and directed by Alejandro Pereyra.

See also
 Cinema of Bolivia

References

External links
 

2009 films
Bolivian drama films